This is an overview of all elections and referendums held in the Czech Republic since the first time in 1968.

List